This is a list of Islands of Portugal, including islets (Portuguese: ilhéu  or ilhote).  The islands (Portuguese: Ilha) are listed by region.

Continental Portugal

Algarve Region
Islands in the Algarve Region include:
 Ilhéu do Alcorão, 
 Ilhéu das Alturas, 
 Armona, 
 Barreta, 
 Barro
 Ilha de Cabanas, 
 Cacela, 
 Cacela da Abóbora
 Ilhote dos Cavalos, 
 Ilhote da Cobra, 
 Coco, 
 Ilhote da Cruz,  
 Culatra, 
 Geada
 Ilhéu dos Gemidos, 
 Martinhal (Ilhotes do Martinhal), 
 Ilhote do Pego, 
 Ilhote das Ratas, 
 Tavira,

Alentejo Region
The islands in the Alentejo Region include:
 Ariana
 Azenha Brava
 Bacelos
 Bacelos Pequena
 Cascalheira
 Freixial
 Juromenha
 Lebre
 Lezíria Internacional
 Perceveira
 Pessegueiro, 
 Moinho
 Monte Branco
 Palmeira
 Palmeira Pequena
 Safra
 São Brás

Central Region
Islands in the Central Region include:
 A Nova
 Agolada
 Almourol, 
 Amoroso
 Baleal, 
 Bugio, 
 Cambalhão
 Carmona
 Estrada
 Fora
 Gaga
 Gaivota
 Gramatal
 Idanha
 Lombo
 Marcehal
 Marinha Nova
 Matadouce
 Monte Farinha
 Morraceira
 Mo-do-Meio
 Ovos
 Parrachill
 Pedra
 Poço
 Rato
 Samos
 Testada
 Tranqueria
 Três Postes
 Turbina

In addition, the archipelago of the Berlengas includes one island and a two-islet group:
 Berlenga Grande, 
 Estelas Islets, 
 Farilhões-Forcados Islets (rocks),

North Region
The North Region includes the following islands:

 Amores, 
 Boega, 
 Ermal, 
 Insua,

Azores archipelago

The archipelago of the Azores is politically organized as an autonomous region and includes nine islands and the Formigas islet group:
 Corvo, 
 Faial, 
 Flores, 
 Graciosa, 
 Pico, 
 Santa Maria, 
 São Jorge, 
 São Miguel, 
 Terceira, 
 Formigas,

Madeira Archipelago

The archipelago of Madeira is politically organized as an autonomous region and includes two principal islands and two minor island groups:
 Madeira, 
 Porto Santo, 
 Desertas
 Deserta Grande, 
 Bugio, 
 Chão Islet, 
 Selvagens
 Selvagem Grande, 
 Selvagem Pequena, 
 Palheiro da Terra Islet, 
 Palheiro do Mar Islet, 
 Fora Islet, 
 Alto Islet
 Comprido Islet, 
 Redondo Islet
 Norte Islets

See also
Exclusive economic zone of Portugal
List of islands of São Tomé and Príncipe and List of islands of Cape Verde (discovered by Portuguese explorers)

References

Portugal, List of islands of
 
Islands